The Aznavour Centre
 (an erroneous version is circulated in media as "Charles Aznavour House-Museum") is Aznavour Foundation's first cultural project.
The French President Emmanuel Macron and the Armenian President Armen Sarkissian were present at the Aznavour Centre project presentation.

Location
Aznavour Centre is located in Yerevan, at the top of Cascade Hill.

Activities 
Aznavour Centre hosts educational and cultural events: concerts, exhibitions, conferences.

Interactive Museum 
In 2021, an interactive museum of Charles Aznavour will be opened at the Aznavour Centre. The 10 museum halls will tell the visitors about key stages of Charles Aznavour's life: from his childhood to worldwide recognition. His personal story will be presented through an audio-guide, recorded by Aznavour. The museum halls will also be functional providing the visitors with the possibilities to record and mix songs, etc.

Cultural and Educational Centre 
Aznavour Centre will also have a huge educational and cultural part focusing on three areas: cinema, music and French language.

French Language Teaching 
Aznavour Centre will provide French teaching courses, where in parallel with the traditional methods, a new methodology of French language teaching will be implemented, based on the songs of Charles Aznavour. Thanks to the cooperation with the French Institute, a rich media library will be created in the centre.

Gallery

See also 
 List of music museums

References

Museums in Yerevan
Biographical museums in Armenia
Music museums
Music organizations based in Armenia
Museums established in 2011
2011 establishments in Armenia
Charles Aznavour